Majdan Golczański is a village in the administrative district of Gmina Jarocin, within Nisko County, Subcarpathian Voivodeship, in south-eastern Poland.

The village has an approximate population of 685.

References

Villages in Nisko County